Canthon cyanellus is a species in the beetle family Scarabaeidae.

References

Further reading

 

Deltochilini
Articles created by Qbugbot
Beetles described in 1859